The Best of Sophie B. Hawkins is the name of two albums:

The Best of Sophie B. Hawkins (2002 album)
The Best of Sophie B. Hawkins (2003 album)